Toome Upper is a barony in County Antrim, Northern Ireland. To its south lies Lough Neagh, and it is bordered by five other baronies: Toome Lower to the north; Antrim Lower to the north-east; Antrim Upper to the east; Massereene Lower to the south-east; and Loughinsholin to the south-east. Toome Upper also formed part of the medieval territories known as the Route and Clandeboye.

History

List of settlements
Below is a list of settlements in Toome Upper:

Towns
Ahoghill (also part of baronies of Toome Lower and Antrim Lower)
Antrim (also part of barony of Toome Lower)
Milltown
Randalstown

Population centres
Crosskeys
Toome
Newferry
Whiteside's Corner

List of civil parishes
Below is a list of civil parishes in Toome Upper:
Antrim (split with barony of Antrim Upper)
Ballyscullion (split with barony of Loughinsholin)
Cranfield
Drummaul
Duneane
Grange of Ballyscullion
Grange of Shilvodan

References

 
Clandeboye